W. K. McClure was a college football player. He was a prominent end for the Tennessee Volunteers of the University of Tennessee from 1912 to 1915. McClure was selected All-Southern in 1913.

References

American football ends
Tennessee Volunteers football players
All-Southern college football players